Franklin Heights High School is a high school in Columbus, Ohio.  It is 1 of 5 high schools in the South-Western City Schools district. The mascot is the Golden Falcon. Franklin Heights derives many students from the neighborhood Riverbend, Columbus, Ohio. It has many boys and girls athletic teams, a marching band, drama club, and an NJROTC unit.

Athletics

 Track & Field (Indoor & Outdoor)
 Girls Soccer
 Boys Soccer
 Boys Tennis
 Volleyball
 Baseball
 Marching Band
 Football
 Gymnastics
 Wrestling

Notes and references

External links
 District Website
 School Website

High schools in Franklin County, Ohio
Educational institutions established in 1954
High schools in Columbus, Ohio
Public high schools in Ohio
1954 establishments in Ohio